Irudhi Pakkam is a 2021 Indian Tamil-language thriller film written and directed by Mano Ve Kannathasan and produced by Insomniacs Dream Creations LLP. The film stars Amrutha Srinivasan, Rajesh Balachandiran, ShreeRaj and Vignesh Shanmugam in lead roles. The film's music is composed by M. S. Jones Rupert, whilst cinematography is performed by Praveen Balu and edited by Ram Pandian.

Cast 
Amrutha Srinivasan as Iyal
Rajesh Balachandran as Kumar
Vignesh Shanmugam as Prasanth
Shree Raj as Mithun
Girija Hari as Jennifer
Pasupathi Raj as Ramaswami
Kishore Rajkumar as Sundaresan

Production 
The film marked the directorial debut of Mano Ve Kannathasan, an engineer-turned-filmmaker. Amrutha was selected after the filmmaker had seen her work on earlier web series projects such as Livin (2017) and Kallachirippu (2018). Mano felt that as she was also a theatre artiste, she would be comfortable to shoot in the style of guerrilla filmmaking. Theatre artiste and trainer Rajesh Balachandran, who had acted in Chennai 2 Singapore (2017), was also selected to play a crucial role in this film, as were Vignesh Shanmugam, Shree Raj, who had acted in the Malayalam film Cuban Colony (2018), Swayam Siddha and Kishore Rajkumar, the director of Naai Sekar (2022).

Amrutha married actor Karthik Kumar, a week before the release of the film.

Release 
The film was released on 17 December 2021 across theatres in Tamil Nadu. A critic from The Times of India gave the film a positive review, noting it "is a good thriller with an interesting plot that can intrigue the inner detective in you". The film was also reviewed by Tamil dailies Dinamalar and Maalai Malar.

References

External links 
 

2020s Tamil-language films
2021 films
Indian thriller films